The Marquess of Salisbury formed his second ministry, in an alliance with the Liberal Unionist Party, following the 1886 general election and his reappointment as the British prime minister by Queen Victoria.

Cabinet

August 1886 to January 1887

January 1887 to August 1892
In 1887 a Liberal Unionist, George Goschen, joined the ministry as Chancellor of the Exchequer.

Changes
February 1888Sir Michael Hicks Beach succeeds Lord Stanley of Preston as President of the Board of Trade.
September 1889Henry Chaplin enters the Cabinet as President of the Board of Agriculture.
October 1891Arthur Balfour succeeds the late William Henry Smith as First Lord of the Treasury and Leader of the House of Commons. William Jackson succeeds him as Chief Secretary for Ireland.

List of ministers

Notes

References

 
 

British ministries
Government
1886 establishments in the United Kingdom
1892 disestablishments in the United Kingdom
Ministries of Queen Victoria
Cabinets established in 1886
Cabinets disestablished in 1892
1880s in the United Kingdom
1890s in the United Kingdom